I Made Adi Wirahadi (born 24 April 1983) is an Indonesian professional footballer who plays as a striker for Liga 2 club PSDS Deli Serdang, on loan from  Liga 1 club Bhayangkara. He is also a First Police Brigadier in the Indonesian National Police.

Club career

Bhayangkara
Wirahadi was signed for Bhayangkara to play in Liga 1 in the 2019 season. He made his debut on 26 July 2019 as a substitute in a match against Arema at the Kanjuruhan Stadium, Malang.

Sulut United
He was signed for Sulut United to play in Liga 2 in the 2020 season. This season was suspended on 27 March 2020 due to the COVID-19 pandemic. The season was abandoned and was declared void on 20 January 2021.

Honours

Club
Persebaya Surabaya
 Liga Primer Indonesia: 2011
PSMS Medan
 Liga 2 runner-up: 2017
Kalteng Putra
 Liga 2 third place (play-offs): 2018

References

External links
 I Made Wirahadi at Soccerway
 I Made Wirahadi at Liga Indonesia

Indonesian footballers
Indonesian Premier League players
Association football forwards
Living people
1983 births
Balinese people
Indonesian Hindus
Indonesian Premier Division players
Liga 1 (Indonesia) players
Liga 2 (Indonesia) players
Perseden Denpasar players
Persita Tangerang players
Pelita Jaya FC players
Persebaya Surabaya players
Persijap Jepara players
Persiba Bantul players
Perseru Serui players
Persiba Balikpapan players
Bali United F.C. players
PSMS Medan players
PSS Sleman players
Kalteng Putra F.C. players
Bhayangkara F.C. players
PSDS Deli Serdang players
People from Denpasar
Sportspeople from Bali